Henryk VII may refer to:

 Henry VII of Brzeg (1343/45 – 1399)
 Henry VII Rumpold (ca. 1350 – 1395)